Judge Lindsey may refer to:

Ben B. Lindsey (1869–1943), judge of the Colorado county court and juvenile court, and of the California Superior Court
Joseph C. Lindsey (born 1959), judge of the Virginia Fourth Judicial Circuit